Fergus Michael Medwin (10 July 1874 – 25 September 1934) was an Australian Labor politician. He was born at Black River in Tasmania. In 1928 he was elected to the Tasmanian House of Assembly as a Labor member for Darwin. He resigned from the Labor Party in 1931 and lost his seat in that year's election. Medwin died in Stanley in 1934.

References

1874 births
1934 deaths
20th-century Australian politicians
Independent members of the Parliament of Tasmania
Members of the Tasmanian House of Assembly
Australian Labor Party members of the Parliament of Tasmania